Julie Saunders married name Julie Leake, is an English female international lawn and indoor bowler.

Bowls career
Saunders won the English National title in 2005 representing Hampshire. By winning the National title she represented England at the 2006 World Singles Champion of Champions event in Christchurch, New Zealand where she won the gold medal defeating Julie Keegan in the final.

In 2011 she won the fours gold medal and the triples silver medal at the Atlantic Bowls Championships. In 2022, she won the champion of champions title at the 2022 Bowls England National Finals.

Personal life
Saunders is a sports coach at Bryanston School, near Blandford Forum and married fellow bowler Roy Leake (a former fours National finalist) in Las Vegas during 2012.

References

Living people
English female bowls players
1962 births